The 1998 United States Senate election in Indiana was held November 3, 1998. Incumbent Republican U.S. Senator Dan Coats decided to retire instead of seeking a second full term. Democratic nominee, former Governor Evan Bayh won the open seat his father once held.

Candidates

Democratic 
 Evan Bayh, former Governor

Republican 
 Paul Helmke, Mayor of Fort Wayne

Results

Overall

By county 

Bayh won 88 of Indiana's counties compared to 4 for Helmke.

See also 
 1998 United States Senate elections

References 

1998
Indiana
United States Senate
Evan Bayh